Merengue is a style of Dominican music and dance. Merengue is the national dance of the Dominican Republic and is also important to national identity in the country. It is a type of danced walk and is accessible to a large variety of people with or without dance experience. The music of merengue draws influence from European and Afro-Cuban styles and mainly uses instruments like guitars, drums, and a charrasca or metal scraper. The dance originated as a rural dance and later became a ballroom dance. Merengue has three distinct sections: the paseo, the merengue proper, and the closing jaleo which includes improvisation.

Partners hold each other in a closed position. The leader holds the follower's waist with their right hand and the follower's right hand with their left hand at the follower's eye level. Partners bend their knees slightly left and right, thus making the hips move left and right. The hips of the leader and follower move in the same direction throughout the song. The rhythm of these steps often accentuates either the right or left step. This pattern is often known as a ‘danced walk’. During this dance, a dancer will mostly put their weight on the same foot. Partners may walk sideways or circle each other, in small steps. They can switch to an open position and do separate turns without letting go of each other's hands or by releasing one hand. During these turns, they may twist their handhold into intricate pretzels. Other choreographies are also possible.

Although the tempo of the music may be frenetic, the upper body is kept steady and turns are slow, typically four beats/steps per complete turn.

In the social dancing of the United States the "empalizada" style is replaced by exaggerated Cuban motion, taught in chain ballroom studios for dances of Latin American origin (cha-cha-cha, rumba, mambo, salsa).

History

Merengue music and dance rose to popularity in the Dominican Republic during the Haitian occupation of Santo Domingo from 1822 to 1844. After the occupation ended, Dominican merengue was changed to distance its origins from Haiti. The tempo of Dominican merengue was increased to differentiate it from Haitian Méringue along with other musical changes. Both still share the danced walk as their basic step. The relatively easy steps of merengue allowed it to be easily learned and popularized. In terms of dance, Dominican merengue is often done with less space between partners and different hip movements as compared to the Haitian version. Many of these changes were fueled by anti-Haitian and anti-black sentiments during this time.

Around this time Puerto Rico's governor, Juan de la Pezuela y Cevallos, banned merengue in Puerto Rico for its "corrupting influence" including a ten-day prison sentence for dancing it. Also around this time, merengue began being written and spoken about disapprovingly by elites in Dominican society. They argued that the dance, which contained hip movements, was too scandalous for ballrooms. Merengue then became mostly danced by rural peoples who embraced the dance and its African heritage.
According to Ramiro Burr, merengue was originally performed with acoustic groups.  During the 20th century, merengue's original lead instrument was the guitar. By the 1940s and 1950s it was performed with accordions. This form known as Merengue típico originated in the rural Northern Cibao region around the city of Santiago, resulting in the name merengue cibaeño. Merengue típico  emphasizes traditional songs dating back as far as the nineteenth century. This style of merengue was popularized by former dictator Rafael Trujillo, who was from the Cibao region. Trujillo and his brother, Jose Arismendy Trujillo, turned merengue into the cultural symbol that it is today by investing in merengue bands and controlling many aspects of the music industry. They used merengue as a form of propaganda and national pride. Previously merengue had often been as a social commentary and under Trujillo it morphed to songs that praised him and the government. Because of Trujillo's influence Merengue típico is now the main form of merengue in the Dominican Republic.

See also
Music of the Dominican Republic
Culture of the Dominican Republic
 Latin American music
 Méringue (Haitian version)
 Cuarteto (Argentine version)
 Merengue Music

References

Further reading

Díaz Díaz, Edgardo. 2008. "Danza antillana, conjuntos militares, nacionalismo musical e identidad dominicana: retomando los pasos perdidos del merengue". Latin American Music Review 29(2): 229–259.

Latin dances
Latin American folk dances
Ballroom dance
Partner dance
Merengue music
Dominican Republic culture
Dance in the Dominican Republic